James Hammond may refer to:

James Hammond (author) (1710–1742), English poet and politician
James B. Hammond (1839–1913), American inventor
James Henry Hammond (1807–1864), politician, Democrat from South Carolina
James Hammond Trumbull (1821–1897), scholar and philologist
Jim Hammond (Idaho politician) (born 1950), politician, Republican Idaho state senator
James Thaddeus Hammond (1856–1942), politician, Secretary of State of Utah
Jim Hammond (footballer) (1907–1985), footballer
Jim Hammond (trade unionist), British trade union leader and communist activist
Jim Hammond aka Human Torch (android)